Mahmudabad-e Kashantu (also Romanized as Maḩmūdābād-e Kāshāntū; also known as Maḩmūdābād) is a village in Cham Chamal Rural District, Bisotun District, Harsin County, Kermanshah Province, Iran. At the 2006 census, its population was 254, in 56 families.

References 

Populated places in Harsin County